'Francis Omoto Masakhalia is a Kenyan politician. He was minister for Finance in Kenya and the first member of parliament for the Butula Constituency. He holds a PhD in Development Economics.

References

Year of birth missing (living people)
Living people
Members of the National Assembly (Kenya)
Ministers of Finance of Kenya